The Edayar Grameena Vayanasaya (Reg. No. 535) is one of the "Grade A" public libraries in Kerala and is in Ernakulam district, located in Edayar. It is affiliated to Kerala State Library Council and has a collection of more than 14,246 books on various subjects.

It was established earlier in 1924 as "Martha Mariyam Vayanasala" in St. Mary’s Jacobite Church with a good collection of books and opened for public. After a few years, with the support of the people in Edayar, library owned about half acres of land in Peedikappady and constructed a new building with memorial hall, reading and circulation rooms and an independent office. A vast play ground with an open air auditorium served several cultural events happened through many years in this village.
 
Apart from revenues from members, the library receives a government grant from the Kerala State Government. It includes a good amount for purchasing new books and other library activities. Library also gets grants from the local Punchayat and different government sources. Around 500 new books are adding every year to the existing collection.

Library organizing social programs such as Nursery school, /Saksharatha Kendram (Adult literacy center) and a Kung fu Training Center. Various programs sponsored by local and government agencies are also hosted and held here.

The major event celebrate here is Thiruvonam. On the day library organize different cultural programs and celebrate Onam with the entire people in Edayar.
Library has an Administration Committee of ten members for a period of two years, elected by the library members. Election procedures are equal to a basic Indian election method and the candidates are among the library members, may be from different political groups. Youngsters of Edayar commonly active in election and do the administration of library.

In 2001 library has celebrated its Platinum Jubilee with many events and opened a Platinum Jubilee Mandiram as a new recreation building.

Libraries in Kerala
1924 establishments in India
Libraries established in 1924